The 1871 New Zealand census was New Zealand's sixth national census. The day used for the census was Monday, 27 February 1871. It was the first census held in New Zealand for which separate reports were produced.

The total population of the Colony of New Zealand was counted as 256,393 of whom 150,356 were Males and 106,037 Females - an increase of 37,725 people, 17.25% since the previous 1867 census. Only the European population was counted; no Māori census was held.

Population and dwellings
The distribution of this population through the principal divisions of the Colony was as follows:

Note: Includes Stewart Island and (Chatham Islands Males 89, Females 44, Total 133)

Birthplace
The figures show that of the total population of specified birthplace had New Zealand-born were 36.46% and a majority of 63.54% were born-overseas of the total resident population.

Religious denominations
Members of Christian denominations formed 94.51 per cent. of those who made answer to the inquiry at the last census; non-Christian sects were 5.49 per cent.; and those who described themselves as of Otherwise described 2.38 per cent.; whilst "Objecting to state" religions constituted 3.36 per cent.

See also
New Zealand census

References

1871 in New Zealand
Censuses in New Zealand
New Zealand